Dârülmuallimât or Women's Teachers' Training College was founded in Istanbul in 1870.  It was the first state college for women in Istanbul, in Turkey, and in the Ottoman Empire, and played a major pioneer role in the education history of women.

History
The college was founded as a part of the Tanzimat reforms. In 1858, the first state schools open to girls were opened in the Ottoman Empire, and in 1869, girls were also included in the state school system through state girls' schools (though for a long time this was on paper only). Since it was considered unacceptable to have male teachers instruct female students because of the then customary Islamic gender segregation, it was deemed necessary to found a college to educate women teachers to work in the state girls' schools.

References
 

Girls' schools in Turkey
1870 establishments in the Ottoman Empire
History of women in Turkey
Educational institutions established in 1870